Buče is a small town in the municipality of Berane, Montenegro. According to the 2011 census, its population was 932.

Demographics

Ethnicity in 2011

References

Populated places in Berane Municipality
Serb communities in Montenegro